Munson Hall is a residence hall on the campus of George Washington University, located at 2212 Eye St., Northwest, Washington, D.C. in the Foggy Bottom neighborhood.

History
The building was designed by Robert O. Scholz and was built in 1937.  It was known as the Munson Hall Apartments and became a residence hall in 1981. 

It is an eight-story structure that is similar in style and form as the Jacqueline Bouvier Kennedy Onassis Hall next door. The exterior is covered in buff brick with cast stone detailing. There is a slightly projecting center bay with a recessed entrance with vertical cast stone banding.  The entrance also features three medallions and two panels with decorative scroll work. 

It was listed on the District of Columbia Inventory of Historic Sites and the National Register of Historic Places in 2010.

See also
H.B. Burns Memorial Building
Corcoran Hall
Fulbright Hall
Madison Hall
Stockton Hall
Hattie M. Strong Residence Hall

References

Residential buildings completed in 1937
Residential buildings on the National Register of Historic Places in Washington, D.C.
George Washington University buildings and structures
Foggy Bottom
1937 establishments in Washington, D.C.